Fiscal Responsibility Act may refer to:

Tax Equity and Fiscal Responsibility Act of 1982, an Act of the United States Congress
Fiscal Responsibility Act of 2007, a proposed Act of the United States Congress
Fiscal Responsibility Act 2010, an Act of the United Kingdom Parliament